Barcos de Cristal (Spanish for "Crystal Ships") is the title of the fifth studio album by singer-songwriter & producer Thomas Anders. It is his first solo album to be sung in Spanish. It was released in 1994 in the United States for Latin America, and was produced by Ralf Stemmann and Christian De Walden (Marta Sánchez). Some tracks were co-written by Thomas Anders aka Chris Copperfield. A title track was used for the Argentine TV-series and reached No.1 in Argentina. Tu Chica Es Mi Chica was recorded as a duet with Glenn Medeiros. Una Mañana De Sol is a cover in Spanish on When Will I See You Again by The Three Degrees. Luna De Plata was covered by Kiara in 1995.

Track listing 

 "Tonterias" (Chris Copperfield, Ralf Stemmann, Mike Shepstone, Carlos Toro) – 3:43
 "Luna De Plata" (Steve Singer, Lisa Catherine Cohen, Aides Hidding, Carlos Toro) – 4:01
 "Miedo De Ti" (Chris Copperfield, Margaret Harris, Ralf Stemmann, Carlos Toro) – 3:38
 "Tu Chica Es Mi Chica" (Duo Con Glenn Medeiros) (Rick Lane, Lee York, Mike Shepstone, Carlos Toro) – 4:05
 "Barcos De Cristal" (Steve Singer/Mike Shepstone, Carlos Toro) – 3:55
 "Una Mañana De Sol" (Kenneth Gamble, Leon Huff, Carlos Toro) – 3:26
 "Para Sonia" (Chris Copperfield, Mike Shepstone, Carlos Toro) – 4:02
 "Con Palabras" (Chris Copperfield, Ralf Stemmann, Mike Shepstone, Carlos Toro) – 3:59
 "Sueños" (Lisa Catherine Cohen/Romano Musumarra, Carlos Toro) – 4:00
 "Mi Chica Prohibida" (Max Di Carlo, Margaret Harris, Christian De Walden, Ralf Stemmann, Carlos Toro) – 3:30

Personnel 

 Produced and arranged by: Christian De Walden and Ralf Stemmann
 Co-Produced by and engineered by: Walter Clissen
 Recorded at Flamingo Café Recording Studio, Studio City, CA
 Mixed at Enterprise Studios, North Hollywood, CA
 Engineered and mixed by: Walter Clissen, Assisted by John Schmidt
 Digitally mastered by: Brian Gardner at Bernie Grundman Mastering, Hollywood, CA
 Design and Art: Graff Group, Miami, FL

Musicians 

 Synclavier programming: Ralf Stemmann
 Keyboards: Ralf Stemmann and Randy Kerber
 Acoustic piano: Randy Kerber, Larry Steelman
 Guitars: Tim Pierce
 Acoustic Guitars: Tim Pierce, Paul Jackson Jr.
 Bass: Bob Parr
 Sax and Flute solo: Doug Norwine and Warren  Ham
 Horns: "The Heart Attack" Bill Bergman, Greg Smith, Dan Fornero, Dennis Farias and Nick Lane
 Percussion: Paulinho Da Costa
 Stings: "LA Express Strings"
 Background vocals arrangements: Christian De Walden, Kenny O'Brien
 Background vocals: Kenny O'Brien, Brandy Jones, Bambi Jones, Isela Sotelo, Leyla Hoyle, Francis Benitez and Ali Olmo

References

External links 
 Tribute to Thomas Anders

See also 
 Marta Sánchez – Mujer (1993)

1994 albums
Thomas Anders albums